Heinz (Heinrich) Ulrich Feldmann is a German-American virologist who currently serves as the chief of the laboratory of virology at Rocky Mountain Laboratories, NIAID and heads the Disease Modelling and Transmission section. His research focuses on highly pathogenic viruses that require strict biocontainment, including those that cause viral hemorrhagic fever such as Ebola and Lassa. He has been responsible for the development of timely viral countermeasures including the rVSV-ZEBOV vaccine (Ervebro), development of vaccines and drugs against SARS-CoV-2, and epidemiology of SARS-CoV.

Education 
Heinz received his MD from the University of Marburg in 1987 and his PhD in 1988. His doctoral thesis focused on the structural relationship between alpha-influenzavirus serotype hemagglutinin 10 in mammals and avians. He conducted joint postdoctoral research at the University of Marburg and the CDC special pathogens branch in Atlanta, Georgia.

Career 
From 1999-2008, he served as the chief of the special pathogens branch at the National Microbiology Laboratory at PHAC. In 2008, he began his tenure as the chief of the laboratory of virology at Rocky Mountain Laboratories at NIAID.

References 

This article incorporates public domain material from websites or documents of the National Institutes of Health.

Expatriate academics in the United States
German virologists
American virologists
National Institutes of Health people
21st-century American biologists
German medical researchers
Living people
University of Marburg alumni
Centers for Disease Control and Prevention people
American medical researchers
Year of birth missing (living people)
Fellows of the American Academy of Microbiology
Members of the National Academy of Medicine